Allium lachnophyllum is a species of wild onion native to Israel and Palestine. It is a bulb-forming perennial that produces an umbel of flowers.

References

lachnophyllum
Onions
Flora of Israel
Flora of Palestine (region)
Plants described in 1875
Flora of Lebanon and Syria